This Is What Winning Looks Like is a 2013 documentary by Ben Anderson on the International Security Assistance Force (ISAF), a NATO-led mission in Afghanistan, to train the Afghan National Security Forces (ANSF) and assist in rebuilding key government institutions.

In 2007, Anderson documented the "undermanned [and] underequipped" British forces fighting the Taliban in Helmand, Afghanistan. The documentary begins in December 2012, when Anderson followed United States Marines as they trained the Afghan National Army and Afghan National Police to take control when United States forces leave Afghanistan. The film uncovers a less than seamless transition, revealing rampant sexual abuse and killing of young boys by Afghan police commanders and other adult men as part of a cultural practice called bacha bazi, addiction to drugs such as opiates and marijuana, corruption, insider attacks and double agents inside the Afghan security forces, and false imprisonment of prisoners by Afghan officials. Afghan officers are less than willing to rectify the issues and prosecute those responsible. During filming, there was an attempt on the life of an effective Afghan commander by a soldier under his command, and four boys were shot while trying to escape abuse at the hands of police commanders, three of which were fatal. To date, none of the commanders responsible for the abuse have been arrested or investigated.

American and British officials receive and broadcast the message that they are succeeding in Afghanistan, despite the beliefs of soldiers on the ground, such as United States Marine Major Bill Steuber, the commanding officer of the police advisory team. Steuber described the rampant corruption, giving examples of skimming ammunition off supplies, fuel off shipments, and claiming unusable vehicles for oil and fuel money. He explains the pressure of working with people who regularly rob and murder civilians, and molest children, stating that it "wears on you after a while".

Anderson summarizes, "All it is now is about getting out and saving face. We're not leaving because we achieved our goals. We're leaving because we've given up on achieving those goals."

Bacha bazi 

Bacha bazi is a custom in parts of Afghanistan and Pakistan, practiced for centuries, where young boys are kidnapped and sexually abused by older men, as well as coerced to dance for all-male audiences, often seductively and dressed as women.

While President Hamid Karzai had signed an agreement to ban bacha bazi, corruption, lawlessness and poverty will allow the business to thrive. Moreover, combating the abuse of poor children is not seen as a priority by the Kabul administration. While Khaled Hosseini’s novel The Kite Runner exposed bacha bazi, greater international pressure is needed to bring the odious practice to an end.

Although illegal in Afghanistan, bacha bazi continues unchallenged due to its widespread nature and influential participants, such as senior officials. Using a selective translation of Islamic law and a liberal interpretation of what constitutes homosexuality, the practice reveals the perception of relationships with prepubescent boys and the value of women in society. The boys are coveted as signs of wealth and status, not unlike horse racing or dog fighting. According to one practitioner, "Having a boy has become a custom for us. Whoever wants to show off, should have a boy".

Reception 
A guest columnist in Foreign Policy wrote that the film "shows what most coalition forces in Helmand, and Afghanistan more broadly, experience".

Aftermath 
During an interview in November 2020, Anderson reported that Steuber had been continuously reporting abuse, such as bachi bazi, to senior personnel, resulting in his military career being cut short.

See also 

 War in Afghanistan (2001–2021)

References

External links
 "This Is What Winning Looks Like." - YouTube account of Vice
 "Gedemoraliseerd in Afghanistan." NRC Handelsblad. 20 May 2013.

Documentary films about the War in Afghanistan (2001–2021)
American documentary films